Julia Beatrice Keleher (born November 15, 1974) is an American educator, former Secretary of the Puerto Rico Department of Education (PRDE) under the Ricardo Rosselló administration and a federal convict for public corruption.

Early life and education 
Keleher grew up as an only child in an Italian community in South Philadelphia, Pennsylvania. She graduated from Cardinal O'Hara High School in 1992. Keleher earned her BA in Political Science (1996) and her Master's in Psychological Services (1998) from the University of Pennsylvania. She completed her Doctor of Education in Educational Leadership (2007) from the University of Delaware and received her Master of Business Administration from Strayer University in 2013. She is a certified Project Management Professional from the Project Management Institute (2009) and is certified in Strategic Decision Making and Risk Management from Stanford University.

Keleher & Associates, LLC 
In 2009, Keleher founded Keleher & Associates, in Washington, D.C., a planning and project management firm. On August 8, 2016, the firm obtained a contract with the PRDE for $231,030 dollars; the contract was valid until June 30, 2017.

US Department of Education 
From 2007 to 2010, Keleher worked for the United States Department of Education (ED) as a program manager for Puerto Rico Technical Assistance Leader, where she operationalized and executed a strategy for increasing the department’s capacity to mitigate risk in the grant portfolio.

Puerto Rico Secretary of Education 
On December 28, 2016, Keleher was appointed Puerto Rico Secretary of Education by Governor-elect Ricardo Rosselló. In her new role, Keleher said her goals were to transform the K-12 educational system by decentralizing the system, where previously all of the decision-making was held with the Office of the Secretary. She instituted seven Local Education Agency (LEA) districts, located in San Juan, Bayamón, Caguas, Humacao, Ponce, Arecibo and Mayagüez, with delegating authority, local decision-making, accountability and new structures.

Hurricane Maria 
On September 20, 2017, Puerto Rico was hit by the most devastating hurricane in 100 years. Hurricane Maria made landfall as a Category 5 hurricane and crossed the island from southeast to north, causing a huge amount of physical and emotional devastation and an unprecedented humanitarian crisis. The hurricane left 95% of the island without communications, food, water and medical care, and all 3.4 million residents lost electrical power.

Like everything else on the island, schools were damaged and shuttered. A total of 164 schools were used as shelters for 9,931 people as a huge number of homes had been completely destroyed. Many of the schools that were not used as shelters were severely damaged by the hurricane, and an estimated 44 schools would never reopen.

World Central Kitchen chef José Andrés asked Keleher to use her power to order schools to open their kitchens and cook for their communities. Keleher posted a message on her social media accounts telling school officials they had permission to use school kitchens. A school administrator later explained to Andrés that schools are required to do just that, by law.

On October 23, 2017, 33 days after the storm, the PRDE re-opened 152 schools in the regions of San Juan and Mayagüez. The department was then able to open more schools, starting on a weekly basis and then on a daily basis. As of November 13, 2017, a total of 755 schools had been re-opened, many of them without power but with running water. Keleher had first estimated that 80% of the schools would reopen by mid-November; it turned out that a total of 932 schools (84%) had reopened by November 16. The PRDE adjusted the school calendar so that students would be able to complete the  academic year.

Keleher argued the hurricane provided Puerto Rico with an opportunity to reform the public school system, citing comparable changes in New Orleans after Hurricane Katrina. On November 8, 2017, US Secretary of Education, Betsy DeVos, Puerto Rican Governor Ricardo Rosselló, and Secretary Julia Keleher, paid a joint visit to the Loaiza Cordero School in the Santurce district of San Juan. Secretary DeVos announced that $2 million of federal funds would be awarded by the ED to aid in the recovery of the schools.

Indictments by FBI 
On July 10, 2019, Keleher was arrested in Washington D.C. by the FBI and accused of unlawfully steering approximately $15 million in federal contracts to politically connected consultants during her tenure as Secretary of Education for Puerto Rico. On January 14, 2020, Keleher was again indicted by the FBI on allegations she used school land for personal gain while Secretary of Education for Puerto Rico. Keleher filed motions to dismiss in both cases and maintained her innocence. These motions were rejected and Keleher's trial was set to start in February 2021.

On January 15, 2020, the FBI announced Keleher had been indicted by a Puerto Rico grand jury on allegations she used school land for personal gain. Specifically, it is alleged that Keleher used her position to exchange 1,034 square feet of a public school in Santurce to a private company in exchange for an apartment in the Ciudadela apartment complex in San Juan.

On May 24, 2021 Judge Francisco Besosa set forth dates; for when Julia Keleher would submit documents regarding her guilty plea and a date for when Keleher would plead guilty in a hearing. On June 8, 2021, the ex-secretary pled guilty before Federal Judge Francisco Besosa for two counts of conspiracy to commit fraud. The plea agreement with US Department of Justice prosecutors included six months in prison, and a year under house arrest. The court has the liberty to accept or not the agreement upon sentencing.

On December 17, 2021, Keleher was officially sentenced to six months in prison and a year under house arrest and a fine of $21,000.

References

Sources 

 

Living people
Members of the 17th Cabinet of Puerto Rico
Secretaries of Education of Puerto Rico
University of Delaware alumni
University of Pennsylvania alumni
University of Pennsylvania Graduate School of Education alumni
Stanford University alumni
Strayer University alumni
1974 births
American politicians convicted of corruption